Chydenanthus is a genus of woody plant in the Lecythidaceae family first described as a genus in 1875. There is only one known species, Chydenanthus excelsus, native to Indonesia, Myanmar, New Guinea, and the Andaman & Nicobar Islands.

References 

Lecythidaceae
Monotypic Ericales genera
Flora of tropical Asia